Clinton Grice Rotenberry Jr.  (born January 12, 1953) was a former American politician and businessman.

Born in Mendenhall, Mississippi, Rotenberry went to Belhaven University and is the owner of Rotenberry Realty in Mendenhall, Mississippi. Rotenberry served in the Mississippi House of Representatives from 1992–2007. Rotenberg was a Republican.

Notes

1953 births
Living people
People from Mendenhall, Mississippi
Businesspeople from Mississippi
Belhaven University alumni
Republican Party members of the Mississippi House of Representatives
21st-century American politicians